Cambodian Public Bank, otherwise known as Campu Bank, is a commercial bank in Cambodia. The bank was established in 1992 and has 30 branches. The bank is owned by the Malaysian Public Bank.

Campu Bank is the largest foreign-owned bank in Cambodia, with assets of $2.1billion.

See also
List of banks in Cambodia

References

External links

Banks of Cambodia
Banks established in 1992
Cambodian companies established in 1992